Kilome is a settlement in Kenya's Eastern Province.The Member of parliament of the 13th parliament of kilome is Nzambia, Thudeeus Kithua affiliated with the Wiper Democratic Movement political party headed by Steven Kalonzo Musyoka.

References 

Populated places in Eastern Province (Kenya)